Minuscule 360 (in the Gregory-Aland numbering), ε 1009 (Soden), is a Greek minuscule manuscript of the New Testament, on parchment. Paleographically it has been assigned to the 11th century. 
It was known as Codex de Rossi 1. 
It has marginalia.

Description 

The codex contains a complete text of the four Gospels on 220 parchment leaves. The text is written in two columns per page, in 23 lines per page.

There is also a division according to the Ammonian Sections (in Mark 233 Sections, the last in 16:8), whose numbers are given at the margin, with references to the Eusebian Canons (written below Ammonian Section numbers).

Synaxarion, Menologion, and lectionary markings at the margin were added by a later hand.

Text 

The Greek text of the codex is a representative of the Byzantine text-type. Aland placed it in Category V.
It has some unusual readings.

According to the Claremont Profile Method it represents textual family Kx in Luke 1, Luke 10, and Luke 20. It creates textual pair with minuscule 358.

History 

The manuscript once belonged to J. B. de Rossi who described it in his catalogue and collated its text (along with minuscule 361). 
The manuscript was added to the list of New Testament manuscripts by Scholz (1794-1852). 
It was examined by Burgon. C. R. Gregory saw it in 1886.

The manuscript is currently housed at the Biblioteca Palatina in Parma (Ms. Parm. 2319).

See also 

 List of New Testament minuscules
 Biblical manuscript
 Textual criticism

References

Further reading 

 

Greek New Testament minuscules
11th-century biblical manuscripts